Martine Ripsrud (born 31 October 1995) is a Norwegian speed skater. She won a bronze medal in team sprint at the 2018 European Speed Skating Championships in Kolomna, Russia, along with Anne Gulbrandsen and Sofie Karoline Haugen. She competed at the World Sprint Speed Skating Championships in 2016, 2017 and 2018.

References

External links

1995 births
Living people
Norwegian female speed skaters
Speed skaters at the 2022 Winter Olympics
Olympic speed skaters of Norway
World Sprint Speed Skating Championships medalists
21st-century Norwegian women